Bernhard I, Duke of Saxe-Meiningen (Gotha, 10 September 1649 – Meiningen, 27 April 1706) was a duke of Saxe-Meiningen.

He was the sixth but third surviving son of Ernst I, Duke of Saxe-Coburg-Altenburg and Elisabeth Sophie of Saxe-Altenburg.

After the death of his father, in 1675, the duchy was jointly governed by him and his brothers; but the duchy was divided
five years later (in 1680); as a result of this divisionary treaty, Bernhard received Meiningen, Wasungen, Salzungen, Untermassfeld, Frauenbreitungen and Ichtershausen. Bernhard became the founder of the Saxe-Meiningen line.

The building of an official residence in Meiningen began immediately. The residence was finished in 1692 and was called Schloss Elisabethenburg, in honor of Bernhard's second wife. Like his brother Ernst, Bernhard's financial stability in his duchy was remarkable. The sales of chamber goods and the additional charge of taxes to the population were the result.

Bernhard's will ordered the indivisibility of the duchy, but not Primogeniture. This allowed his sons to govern the duchy jointly after his death.

Issue
He married in Schloss Friedenstein, Gotha, on 20 November 1671 Marie Hedwig of Hesse-Darmstadt. They had seven children:
 Ernst Ludwig I, Duke of Saxe-Meiningen (b. Gotha, 7 October 1672 – d. Meiningen, 24 November 1724).
 Bernhard (b. Gotha, 28 October 1673 – d. Brussels, 25 October 1694).
 Johann Ernst (b. Gotha, 29 December 1674 – d. Gotha, 8 February 1675).
 Marie Elisabeth (b. Ichtershausen, 11 August 1676 – d. Ichtershausen, 22 December 1676).
 Johann Georg (b. Ichtershausen, 3 October 1677 – d. Ichtershausen, 10 October 1678).
 Frederick Wilhelm, Duke of Saxe-Meiningen (b. Ichtershausen, 16 February 1679 – d. Meiningen, 10 March 1746).
 Georg Ernst (b. Ichtershausen, 26 March 1680 – d. of smallpox, Meiningen, 1 January 1699).

He married secondly in Schöningen on 25 January 1681 Elisabeth Eleonore of Brunswick-Wolfenbüttel daughter of Anthony Ulrich, Duke of Brunswick-Wolfenbüttel. They had five children:
 Elisabeth Ernestine (b. Meiningen, 3 December 1681 – d. Gandersheim, 24 December 1766), Abbess of Gandersheim Abbey (1713–1766).
 Eleonore Frederika (b. Meiningen, 2 March 1683 – d. Meiningen, 13 May 1739), a nun at Gandersheim.
 Anton August (b. Meiningen, 20 June 1684 – d. Meiningen, 7 December 1684).
 Wilhelmine Luise (b. Meiningen, 19 January 1686 – d. Bernstadt, 5 October 1753), married on 20 December 1703 to Charles, Duke of Württemberg-Bernstadt.
 Anton Ulrich, Duke of Saxe-Meiningen (b. Meiningen, 22 October 1687 – d. Frankfurt, 27 January 1763).

Ancestry

References
 Hannelore Schneider, Das Herzogtum Sachsen-Meiningen unter seinen ersten Herzögen. In: 300 Jahre Schloss Elisabethenburg. Südthüringer Research, vol. 27, Meiningen 1994.
 L. Hertel, Meiningische Geschichte von 1680 bis zur Gegenwart. In: Schriften des Vereins für Sachsen-Meiningische Geschichte und Landeskunde, vol. 47, Hildburghausen 1904.

1649 births
1706 deaths
House of Saxe-Meiningen
Dukes of Saxe-Meiningen
People from Gotha (town)